

Jesús Gil Trophy 2005
On 31 December 2005 the Jesús Gil Trophy I started.

ATLÉTICO MADRID: Falcon; Velasco, Pablo, Perea, Molinero; Zainos, Colsa, Gabi, Ibagaza; Petrov, Torres.

REAL MADRID: López; Diogo, Pavón, Mejia, Roberto Carlos; Gravesen, Guti, Balboa, Robinho; Baptista, Soldado.

Atlético Madrid 1-1 Real Madrid
Goals: 0-1 (min. 28) Soldado; 1-1 (min. 74) Ibagaza.
 Win Real Madrid; Penalties 5-6.

Jesús Gil Trophy 2006
On 22 December 2006 the Jesús Gil Trophy II started.

ATLÉTICO MADRID: Cuéllar; Molinero, Pablo, Azcárate, Antonio López; Galletti, Jurado, Gabi, Mista; Torres, Agüero.

REAL MADRID: Lopez; Cannavaro, Pavón, Bravo, Salgado; De la Red, Raúl, Guti, Nieto; Negredo, Reyes.

Atlético Madrid 0-0 Real Madrid
Win Atlético Madrid; Penalties 4-3.

Jesús Gil Trophy 2013
On 21 July 2013 the Jesús Gil Trophy III started, returning after a 7-year absence. Numancia took the place of Real Madrid.

NUMANCIA: Biel Ribas; Isidoro, Juanma, Regalón, Bonilla; Gallardo, Julio Álvarez, David Martín, Bedoya; Nieto, Natalio.

ATLÉTICO MADRID: Courtois; Juanfran, Miranda, Demichelis, Filipe Luís; Mario Suárez, Gabi, Koke, Arda Turan; Adrián, Diego Costa.

Win Atlético Madrid
CD Numancia 2-4 Atlético Madrid
Goals: 0-1 (min. 7) Costa; 0-2 (min. 16) Costa; 0-3 (min. 46) Aquino; 1-3 (min. 56) Palanca; 1-4 (min. 66) Baptistão; 2-4 (min. 69) Palanca.

Jesús Gil Trophy 2014
On 23 July 2014 the Jesús Gil Trophy IV started.

NUMANCIA: Biel Ribas; Gaffoor, Pedraza, Iñigo Perez, Palanca; Juanma, Isidoro, Vicente, Natalio, Bonilla; Sergi Enrich.

ATLÉTICO MADRID: Bono; Juanfran, Miranda, Godín, Siqueira; Mario Suárez, Gabi, Koke, Arda Turan; Raúl García, Mandžukić.

CD Numancia 0-1 Atlético Madrid
Goals: 0-1 (min. 44) Hector Hernández
Win Atlético Madrid

Titles by club

 Atlético Madrid 3 titles.
 Real Madrid 1 title.

Spanish football friendly trophies
Atlético Madrid
2005 establishments in Spain